David Abraham Bueno de Mesquita (23 March 1889 – 12 December 1962) was a Dutch painter. His work was part of the painting event in the art competition at the 1928 Summer Olympics.

References

1889 births
1962 deaths
20th-century Dutch painters
Dutch male painters
Olympic competitors in art competitions
Painters from Amsterdam
20th-century Dutch male artists